Vasile Dumitrescu is a Romanian bobsledder who competed in the 1930s. He won the gold medal in the two-man event at the 1934 FIBT World Championships in Engelberg.

References
Bobsleigh two-man world championship medalists since 1931

Possibly living people
Romanian male bobsledders
Year of birth missing